Agustín Alberione (born 10 August 1996) is an Argentine professional footballer who plays as a defender.

Career
Alberione spent time in the youth ranks of Unión Santa Fe, prior to leaving in 2012 to join Argentinos Juniors. He was promoted into the club's first-team in June 2017 for a Primera B Nacional match with Boca Unidos, he subsequently played the final twenty-five minutes for his professional debut. Another appearance followed a month later versus Nueva Chicago, in a season which ended with Argentinos winning the 2016–17 Primera B Nacional. On 31 January 2018, Alberione joined Independiente Rivadavia of Primera B Nacional on loan. He terminated his loan in March after three appearances.

In January 2019, Alberione's contract with Argentinos Juniors was terminated. He then, on 6 March 2019, completed a move to Uruguay's Deportivo Maldonado. Alberione departed at the end of the year, having only appeared as an unused substitute once; in July versus Cerrito.

Career statistics
.

Honours
Argentinos Juniors
Primera B Nacional: 2016–17

References

External links

1996 births
Living people
People from San Martín Department, Santa Fe
Argentine footballers
Association football defenders
Argentine expatriate footballers
Expatriate footballers in Uruguay
Argentine expatriate sportspeople in Uruguay
Primera Nacional players
Argentine Primera División players
Argentinos Juniors footballers
Independiente Rivadavia footballers
Deportivo Maldonado players
Sportspeople from Santa Fe Province